Mount Hummel is a snow-capped summit that rises above the east-central portion of Grant Island, off the coast of Marie Byrd Land, Antarctica.

References

Mountains of Marie Byrd Land